Beachwood Sparks is the debut album by American alternative country band Beachwood Sparks, released in 2000.

Neal Casal of Ryan Adams & the Cardinals named Beachwood Sparks as one of his favorite albums of all time.

Track listing 
 "Desert Skies"
 "Ballad of Never Rider"
 "Silver Morning After"
 "Singing Butterfly"
 "Sister Rose"
 "This Is What It Feels Like"
 "Canyon Ride"
 "The Reminder"
 "The Calming Seas"
 "New Country"
 "Something I Don't Recognize"
 "Old Sea Miner"
 "See Oh Three"
 "Sleeping Butterfly"

References 

Beachwood Sparks albums
2000 debut albums
Sub Pop albums